Helg is a European surname. Notable people with the surname include:

 Aline Helg, Swiss historian
 Simon Helg (born 1990), Swedish footballer
 Beatrice Helg (born 1956), Swiss photographer
 Franca Helg (1920–1989), Italian designer and architect

Surnames of European origin
Swiss-German surnames